Eia Uus (born in 1985 in Haapsalu) is an Estonian writer.

She graduated from Tallinn University in Estonian language and literature.

Since 2019, she has been a member of Estonian Writers' Union.

Awards
 2005: Eduard Vilde Prize

Works
 novel Kuu külm kuma ('The Moon's Cold Glow') (2005)
 novel Kahe näoga jumal (2008)
 Minu Prantsusmaa (2013)
 Aasta Pariisis (2014)
 Seitsme maa ja mere taha (2019)
 Tüdrukune ('What It Feels Like for a Girl') (2019)

References

1985 births
Living people
Estonian women novelists
21st-century Estonian women writers
Estonian women short story writers
Tallinn University alumni
People from Haapsalu